The 2021 Aragon motorcycle Grand Prix (officially known as the Gran Premio Tissot de Aragón) was the thirteenth round of the 2021 Grand Prix motorcycle racing season. It was held at the MotorLand Aragón in Alcañiz on 12 September 2021.

In the Moto2 class, Red Bull KTM Ajo won their second Teams' Championship.

Qualifying

MotoGP

Race

MotoGP

Moto2

Moto3

Championship standings after the race
Below are the standings for the top five riders, constructors, and teams after the round.

MotoGP

Riders' Championship standings

Constructors' Championship standings

Teams' Championship standings

Moto2

Riders' Championship standings

Constructors' Championship standings

Teams' Championship standings

Moto3

Riders' Championship standings

Constructors' Championship standings

Teams' Championship standings

Notes

References

External links

Aragon
Aragon motorcycle Grand Prix
Aragon motorcycle Grand Prix
Aragon motorcycle Grand Prix